Leila Arjumand Banu (5 January 1929 – 10 February 1995) was a Bangladeshi singer and social activist.

Early life and education
Banu was born on 5 January 1929, to a Bengali Muslim family of zamindars who held lands in Sonargaon. Her father, Syed Muhammed Taifoor, was the son of Zamindar Syed Abdul Aziz. Through her paternal great grandfather Mir Ghulam Mustafa Al-Husayni, she was a descendant of 16th-century Islamic scholar and zamindar Syed Ibrahim Danishmand. She graduated from Eden Girls' School in Dhaka and did her undergraduate degree in Persian and Philosophy from the University of Dhaka. Her education was encouraged and supported by her father, Syed Muhammed Taifoor.

Career
Banu trained under Ustad Gul Mohammad Khan. She trained in classical South Asian Music like Ghazal, Nazrul Geeti, and Rabindra Sangeet. She also sang folk and more modern songs. Her first professional performance was a solo at the inaugural broadcast of All India Radio on 16 December 1939 in Dhaka. She became the first Muslim singer on Dhaka Radio at the age of ten.

From 1977 to 1986 she was an honorary Principal of Dhaka Music College. She served as the trustee of the Dhaka Museum. She was also the chairman of the Nazrul Swaralipi Suddhikaran Board (Nazrul Notation Authentication Board) for 10 years.

Awards
A partial list of Banu's awards:
 Coronation Medal from the Shah of Iran (1968)
 Pride of Performance award from the President of Pakistan (1969)

References

1929 births
1995 deaths
University of Dhaka alumni
20th-century Bangladeshi women singers
20th-century Bangladeshi singers
Bangladeshi feminists
Recipients of the Pride of Performance